Upington railway station is a railway station serving the town of Upington in South Africa. It has been part of the TransNamib Railway that connected Windhoek with the town. The service stopped early in the 2000s.

Dawid Kruiper Local Municipality
Railway stations in South Africa
TransNamib Railway